Dr. Ernest Faber Fookes (31 May 1874 – 3 March 1948) was a New Zealand-born rugby union wing who was capped for the England national team on ten occasions between 1896 and 1899.

Personal history
Born in Waverley, Taranaki, New Zealand, Fookes travelled to England at the age of 15 where he received his college education before gaining his qualifications as a medical doctor in 1899. He married Winifred Laura Capel in 1905 and they had three children, Sydney, Kenneth and Ernestine.

Bibliography

References

1874 births
1948 deaths
Barbarian F.C. players
England international rugby union players
New Zealand rugby union players
Rugby union players from Taranaki
Rugby union wings
New Zealand expatriates in the United Kingdom